Lecania is a genus of robber flies in the family Asilidae. There are about five described species in Lecania.

Species
These five species belong to the genus Lecania:
 Lecania boraceae Carrera, 1958 c g
 Lecania ctesicles (Walker, 1851) c g
 Lecania femorata Macquart, 1838 c g
 Lecania leucopyga (Wiedemann, 1828) c g
 Lecania tabescens Rondani, 1875 c g
Data sources: i = ITIS, c = Catalogue of Life, g = GBIF, b = Bugguide.net

References

Further reading

External links

 
 

Asilidae genera
Asilinae